North Bend State Park sits on  along the North Fork of the Hughes River in Ritchie County near Harrisville, West Virginia.  The park is named after the sharp bend in the river that the formed three sides of the original park boundary.  The North Bend Rail Trail, a 72-mile (116 km) hiking and biking corridor, is also managed as a unit of the park.  A new 305 acre (1.23 km²) lake was recently added to the park.

Features

 29 room Lodge
 9 cabins
 49 campsites
 gift shop
 Swimming pool
 Miniature golf
 Hiking trails 
 Fishing
 Boating
 Boating rental
 Picnic area
 Basketball court
 North Bend Rail Trail
 North Bend Lake

Accessibility

Accessibility for the disabled was assessed by West Virginia University. The assessment found the campground, picnic area, fishing area, and swimming pool to be accessible. The 2005 assessment found issues with access to the lodge, handrails, emergency exits at the lodge and signage in the lodge parking lot.

The park also features two special amenities designed to accommodate handicapped users.  
 The "Extra Mile Trail" is a flat, paved trail suitable for wheelchairs.  
 The new North Bend Lake features a Handicapped Fishing Pier.

See also
List of West Virginia state parks
State park

References

External links
 

State parks of West Virginia
Protected areas of Ritchie County, West Virginia
Protected areas established in 1951
Campgrounds in West Virginia
1951 establishments in West Virginia
IUCN Category III